Nakano Kumiko (中野公美子, born March 3, 1977, in Osaka, Japan) is an actress who debuted as a Japanese idol with the girl band Osaka Performance Doll from 1993 to 1997.

Television
星の金貨 (Hoshi no kinka)
竜馬におまかせ!
Beautiful (ビューティー7)
歓迎！ダンジキ御一行様
木綿のハンカチ2
世紀末の晩鐘

Filmography
たこやき刑事 (Takoyaki Keiji, lit. "takoyaki detective"?)
Persona (2008)

External links
Kumiko's Universe (official site, in Japanese)

1977 births
Living people
Japanese actresses
Japanese idols
Japanese women pop singers
People from Osaka
21st-century Japanese singers
21st-century Japanese women singers